The Macgregor Baronetcy, of Savile Row in the County of Middlesex, is a title in the Baronetage of the United Kingdom. It was created on 17 March 1828 for Patrick Macgregor, Serjeant-Surgeon to King George IV. Charles Reginald Macgregor (1847–1902), second son of the third Baronet, was a Brigadier-General in the Army.

Macgregor baronets, of Savile Row (1828)
Sir Patrick Macgregor, 1st Baronet (died 1828)
Sir William Macgregor, 2nd Baronet (1817–1846)
Sir Charles Macgregor, 3rd Baronet (1819–1879)
Sir William Gordon Macgregor, 4th Baronet (1846–1905)
Sir Cyril Patrick McConnell Macgregor, 5th Baronet (1887–1958)
Sir Robert James McConnell Macgregor, 6th Baronet (1890–1963)
Sir Edwin Robert Macgregor, 7th Baronet (1931–2003)
Ian Grant Macgregor, is the presumed 8th Baronet (born 1959); but his name does not appear on the Official Roll.

Notes

Macgregor